

Horton is an Anglo-Saxon surname, deriving from the common English place-name Horton. It derives from Old English horu 'dirt' and tūn 'settlement, farm, estate', presumably meaning 'farm on muddy soil'.

List of people with the surname Horton
Africanus Horton (1835–1883), scientist, soldier, writer and political thinker from Sierra Leone
Alonzo Horton (1813–1909), American real estate developer
Ann Horton (1894–1965), British physicist
Benjamin Jason Horton (1873–1963), Puerto Rican politician
Bill Horton (disambiguation), several people
Brian Horton (born 1949), English footballer and football manager
Carolyn Price Horton (1909-2001), American bookbinder and conservator
Charles Horton, American football player
Chris Horton (basketball) (born 1994), American basketball player for Hapoel Tel Aviv of the Israeli Basketball Premier League
Claire Horton (born 1962), British charity executive 
Claude Wendell Horton, Jr. (born 1942), American physicist
Claude Wendell Horton, Sr. (1915–2001), American physicist
Clinton T. Horton (1876–1953), New York politician and judge
Christiana Horton (c. 1696 – c. 1756), English actress 
Corinne Stocker Horton (1871-1947), American elocutionist, journalist, newspaper editor
David Horton (disambiguation), several people
Desiree Horton (born 1971), American TV personality
Dodie Horton, American politician
Dylan Horton (born 2000), American football player
Edward Everett Horton (1886–1970), American actor
Ed Horton (born 1967), former American basketball player
Frank Horton (disambiguation), several people
Gene Horton (born 1968), IT Professional
George Horton (disambiguation), several people
Hamilton C. Horton, Jr. (1931–2006), American politician from North Carolina
Henry Hollis Horton (1866–1934), Governor of Tennessee (1927–33)
Herschella Horton (1938-2022), American politician
Jacob Horton (died 1989), senior vice-president of Southern Company
Jack K. Horton (c. 1917 – 2000), American lawyer and business executive.
Jackson Daniel Horton (born 2002)
James Horton (disambiguation), several people
Jerry Horton (born 1975), American musician
John Horton (disambiguation), several people
Johnny Horton (1925–1960), American country music singer
Jonathan Horton (born 1985), American gymnast
Judith Ann Carter Horton (1866–1948), American educator and librarian
Kenneth Horton (disambiguation), several people
Larry Horton (born 1949), American football player
Larry A Horton (born 1944), Inventor, Electrician
Les Horton (1921–2008), English professional footballer
Lester Horton (1906–1953), American dancer
Lesley Horton, British novelist
Mack Horton OAM (born Mackenzie Horton; 1996), an Australian freestyle swimmer
Mark Horton (archaeologist) (born 1956), British maritime archaeologist
Mark Horton (bridge) (born 1950), British bridge player
Martin Horton (born 1934), former English cricketer
Mary Ann Horton (born Mark R. Horton, 1955), American computer scientist
Max Kennedy Horton (1883–1951), British submarine commander during the First World War, and admiral during the Second
Michael Horton (disambiguation), several people
Mike Horton (disambiguation), several people
Mildred McAffee Horton (1900–1994), American academic
Myles Horton (1905–1990), American educator
Nathan Horton (born 1985), Canadian ice hockey player
Nigel Horton (born 1948), English rugby union player
Peter Horton (born 1953), American actor
Richard Horton (editor), British editor of The Lancet medical journal
Robert Horton (disambiguation), several people
S. Wentworth Horton (1885–1960), New York state senator
Samuel Dana Horton (1844–1895), American writer
Scott Horton (disambiguation), several people
Shirley Horton (born c. 1953), American politician
Stanley M. Horton, American theologian
Steven Wayne Horton (1954-2006), American singer
Stuart Horton (born 1963), English rugby league footballer who played in the 1980s and 1990s, and coached in the 1990s
Thomas Horton (disambiguation), several people
Tim Horton (1930–1974), Canadian ice hockey player and coffee shop chain founder
Tommy Horton (1941–2017), English professional golfer
Tony Horton (baseball) (born 1944), former American Major League baseball player
Tony Horton (rugby union) (1938–2020), English rugby union player
Big Walter Horton (1917–1981), American blues harmonica player
William Horton (disambiguation), several people
Willie Horton (disambiguation), several people

Fictional characters
 Alice Horton, character on the TV show The Vicar of Dibley
 David Horton, character on the TV show The Vicar of Dibley
Hugo Horton, character on the TV show The Vicar of Dibley
James Horton (Highlander), character from Highlander: The Series
Sarah Horton, character on the NBC soap opera Days of Our Lives
Dr. Tom Horton, character on the NBC soap opera Days of Our Lives

See also
Talen Horton-Tucker (born 2000), American basketball player
Horton (disambiguation)
Horton (given name)
Hawton
Houghton (surname)
Houghton (disambiguation)
Hoghton (disambiguation)

References

English-language surnames
English toponymic surnames